Françoise Massy F.M.M (born 2 March 1947) is a French Roman Catholic nun and missionary, one of the seven first women appointed members of the Congregation for Institutes of Consecrated Life and Societies of Apostolic Life the second highest-ranking department of the Roman Curia, the administrative institution of the Holy See since 8 July 2019, when was appointed by Pope Francis.

Since 1 October 2014 is the Superior General of the Franciscan Missionaries of Mary.

References 

1947 births
Living people
20th-century French nuns
Women officials of the Roman Curia
Superiors general
Franciscan Missionaries of Mary
French Roman Catholic missionaries
Female Roman Catholic missionaries
Members of the Congregation for Institutes of Consecrated Life and Societies of Apostolic Life
21st-century French nuns